Jim Berkus is an American entertainment industry executive who is co-founder and chairman of United Talent Agency (UTA). Prior to forming UTA, Berkus was a partner at Leading Artists Agency. His clients include the Coen brothers, Barbra Streisand, and Owen Wilson. He often hosts UTA's annual Oscar parties at his home.

Berkus is married to Ria Berkus, and his son, Jordan Berkus, is also an agent at UTA.

References

American chief executives
Living people
American Jews
American company founders
American talent agents
Year of birth missing (living people)